Darrell Ray Larson (born December 13, 1950) is an American film and television actor who appeared in the 1990 action/comedy film Men at Work.

Larson's work includes roles in The Student Nurses (1970), Kotch (1971), The Magnificent Seven Ride! (1972), Futureworld (1976), Partners (1982) and Brainstorm (1983). He had a prominent role in the 1984 film Mike's Murder, and a small part in the 1996 film Eye for an Eye. Larson's television guest star appearances include Matlock, Designing Women, L.A. Law, Morningstar/Eveningstar, and Diagnosis Murder. He also appeared in Law & Order: Special Victims Unit.

Filmography

Film

Television

References

External links 

1950 births
Living people
American male film actors
American male television actors